"Y.BIRD from Jellyfish Island With Seo In Guk"  is the eighth digital single by South Korean singer, Seo In-guk. The single was released on February 4, 2013, containing the title track "I Can't Live Because of You" featuring Verbal Jint. "I Can't Live Because of You" tops various online charts upon its release including Bugs, Cyworld and Soribada.

Background and release
On January 30, 2012, aphoto of Seo in recording studio spread in the internet gaining interest of fans. It was then reported that he will indeed release a new track soon. On February 4, the single was released digitally and features Verbal Jint.

Music video
The teaser for the music video was uploaded through Jellyfish Entertainment's official YouTube account. The full music video was released on the same day of the single's release.

Track listing
※ Bold track title means it is the title track in the album.

Chart

Release history

See also
Y.Bird from Jellyfish Island

References

Korean songs
Jellyfish Entertainment singles
Stone Music Entertainment albums
2013 singles